Shehu Usman Abdullahi (born 12 March 1993) is a Nigerian professional footballer who plays as a defensive midfielder and defender.

Club career

Qadsia SC
In July 2014, Abdullahi moved from Kano Pillars to Kuwait Premier League side Qadsia SC in a deal worth $480,000, of which Abdullahi received $330,000 and Kano Pillars $150,000.

União da Madeira
On 6 June 2015, Shehu joined newly promoted Primeira Liga side C.F. União on a two-year deal.

Anorthosis Famagusta
On 2 September 2016, Shehu joined Cypriot side Anorthosis Famagusta on a two-year deal worth for the 20%  of the player re-sale fee in other European club.

Bursaspor
On 24 January 2018, Shehu signed for two and a half years Turkish side Bursaspor for an undisclosed fee.

Omonia
On 19 September 2020, Shehu signed for the Cyprus First Division side Omonia.

Levski Sofia
On 16 September 2022, Shehu signed with Bulgarian First League club Levski Sofia until the end of the 2022–23 season.

International career

In January 2014, coach Stephen Keshi, invited him to be included in the Nigeria 23-man team for the 2014 African Nations Championship. Shehu earned his first cap on 11 January 2014, in the 1:2 loss against Mali, appearing as a substitute. He helped Nigeria defeat Zimbabwe for a third-place finish by a goal to nil.

He was included in the Nigeria 35-man provisional team for the 2016 Summer Olympics.

In May 2018 he was named in the Nigeria preliminary 30-man team for the 2018 FIFA World Cup, in Russia.

Career statistics

Club

International

Honours

Club
Qadsia
 Kuwait Emir Cup: 2014–15
 Kuwait Super Cup: 2014
 AFC Cup: 2014

Omonia
Cypriot First Division: 2020–21
Cypriot Cup: 2021–22
Cypriot Super Cup: 2021

International
Nigeria U23
 African Games bronze medal: 2015

Nigeria Olympic team
 Summer Olympics bronze medal: 2016

References

External links

1993 births
Living people
Sportspeople from Kano
People from Sokoto
Nigerian footballers
Nigeria international footballers
2014 African Nations Championship players
C.F. União players
Primeira Liga players
Association football midfielders
Footballers at the 2016 Summer Olympics
Olympic footballers of Nigeria
Medalists at the 2016 Summer Olympics
Olympic bronze medalists for Nigeria
Olympic medalists in football
Nigerian expatriate footballers
Expatriate footballers in Kuwait
Nigerian expatriate sportspeople in Kuwait
Expatriate footballers in Portugal
Nigerian expatriate sportspeople in Portugal
Expatriate footballers in Cyprus
Nigerian expatriate sportspeople in Cyprus
Expatriate footballers in Turkey
Nigerian expatriate sportspeople in Turkey
Qadsia SC players
Kano Pillars F.C. players
Anorthosis Famagusta F.C. players
Cypriot First Division players
2018 FIFA World Cup players
Bursaspor footballers
Süper Lig players
Nigeria Professional Football League players
2019 Africa Cup of Nations players
AFC Cup winning players
Kuwait Premier League players
Nigeria under-20 international footballers
AC Omonia players
Nigeria A' international footballers